Jan Thyszoon Payart was a Dutch statesman and administrator who served as Governor of Zeylan (Dutch Ceylon) during the early Dutch period in Ceylon. He was appointed on 1 August 1640 and was Governor until 24 March 1646. He was succeeded by Joan Maetsuycker.

References

Governors of Dutch Ceylon
17th-century Dutch colonial governors